In Greek mythology, the Ophiotaurus was a creature that was part bull and part serpent.

Etymology 
The term ophiotaurus is a compound derived from Ancient Greek ὄφῐς óphis, meaning "serpent", and ταῦρος taûros, meaning "bull".

Mythology
Its sole reference is found in Ovid's Fasti (3.793 ff), where the creature's entrails (insides) were said to grant the power to defeat the gods to whoever burned them. The hybrid was slain by an ally of the Titans during the Titanomachy, but the entrails were retrieved by an eagle sent by Zeus before they could be burned. The creature emerged from Chaos with Gaia and Ouranos.

Popular culture
 The Ophiotaurus appears in Rick Riordan's The Titan's Curse. Percy Jackson saves it, mistakes it for female, and names it "Bessie". The Ophiotaurus, thinking that Percy is its protector, is brought to Olympus and put under the care of Percy's father, Poseidon. The gods consider destroying it, believing that whoever slays the creature and burns its entrails will have the power to overthrow the gods. The Ophiotaurus seems not to mind being mistaken for female; this is a reference to Rick Riordan's son Haley.
 An Ophiotaurus appears in the My Little Pony: Friendship is Magic series in the eighth episode of Season 9, Frenemies.

See also
Horned Serpent

References

 Theoi Project - Tauros Ophis (Ophiotauros)

Mythological hybrids
Greek legendary creatures